András Hajnal (born 21 February 1982) is a Hungarian diver. He competed at the 2000 Summer Olympics and the 2004 Summer Olympics.

References

External links
 

1982 births
Living people
Hungarian male divers
Olympic divers of Hungary
Divers at the 2000 Summer Olympics
Divers at the 2004 Summer Olympics
Divers from Budapest
Sportspeople from Budapest
21st-century Hungarian people